Alcithoe wilsonae is a species of rare large sea snail, a marine gastropod mollusc in the family Volutidae, the volutes.

Description
A. wilsonae is a large neogastropod marine snail.

Distribution
The species is endemic to New Zealand and has a rich fossil record.

References

Further reading
 Dell, R.K. 1978: Additions to the New Zealand Recent molluscan fauna with notes on Pachymelon (Palomelon), National Museum of New Zealand Records, 1(11)
 Powell A W B, New Zealand Mollusca, William Collins Publishers Ltd, Auckland, New Zealand 1979 
 Bail, P., Limpus, A. 2005: A Conchological Iconography 11, The Recent Volutes of New Zealand, with a revision of the genus Alcithoe H. & A. Adams, 1853, ConchBooks, Hackenheim, Germany

External links
 Museum of New Zealand Te Papa Tongarewa, Taxon: Alcithoe wilsonae Powell, 1933 (Species)

Volutidae
Gastropods of New Zealand
Gastropods described in 1933
Taxa named by Arthur William Baden Powell
Endemic fauna of New Zealand
Endemic molluscs of New Zealand